Cayaponia espelina, also known as the São Caetano melon, is a plant native to Brazil. It is a diuretic and aid in the treatment of diarrhea and syphilis. The fruits are occasionally eaten by the maned wolf (Chrysocyon brachyurus).

References

Flora of Brazil
Medicinal plants of South America
Cucurbitoideae
Plants described in 1836